Anne Dudley (born 1956), is an English composer and musician.

Anne Dudley may also refer to:

 Anne Dallas Dudley (1876–1955), activist in the women's suffrage movement in the US
 Anne Dudley, Countess of Warwick (died 1588), née Anne Seymour, writer and daughter of Edward Seymour, Lord Protector of England
 Anne Dudley, Countess of Warwick (died 1604), (1548/1549–1604), lady-in-waiting to Elizabeth I and wife of Ambrose Dudley, 3rd Earl of Warwick
 Anne Dudley (poet) ( 1610–1672), married name Anne Bradstreet, American poet
 Anne (Dudley) Sutton (1589–1615), a companion of Elizabeth Stuart, Queen of Bohemia